Uffe Jensen (born 8 October 1960) is a Danish politician. He is a member of the party Venstre, and is the current mayor of Odder Municipality. He became mayor after the 2013 Danish local elections, but has been in the municipal council since 2009. He has a background as police assistant.

References 

1960 births
Living people
Danish municipal councillors
Mayors of places in Denmark
People from Aarhus
Venstre (Denmark) politicians